Gold(I) fluoride is the inorganic compound with the formula AuF. The solid has eluded isolation, but its existence has been observed by rotational spectroscopy and mass spectrometry as a gas.

When stabilized by an NHC ligand, a gold fluoride complex has been characterized.

References

Gold(I) compounds
Fluorides
Metal halides
Gold–halogen compounds